Urtzi Iriondo Petralanda (born 30 January 1995) is a Spanish professional footballer who plays as a left back.

Club career
Born in Zeberio, Biscay, Basque Country, Iriondo joined Athletic Bilbao's youth setup in 2005, aged ten. Iriondo made his debuts as a senior with the farm team in the 2013–14 campaign, in Tercera División.

On 26 May 2014, Iriondo was promoted to the reserves in Segunda División B. He contributed with 14 appearances and one goal during the season, as the B-side returned to Segunda División after a 19-year absence.

Iriondo made his professional debut on 24 August 2015, starting in a 0–1 home loss against Girona FC. He scored his first goal as a professional on 24 April of the following year, netting his team's second in a 2–3 loss at UD Almería.

On 1 July 2016, Iriondo was loaned to Elche CF also in the second level, for one year. The following 30 June, after suffering relegation, he moved to fellow league team Granada CF also on a temporary one-year deal.

Personal life
Iriondo's identical twin brother  is also a footballer. A midfielder, he too was groomed at Athletic.

References

External links

1995 births
Living people
Spanish twins
People from Arratia-Nerbioi
Twin sportspeople
Spanish footballers
Spanish expatriate footballers
Footballers from the Basque Country (autonomous community)
Association football defenders
Segunda División players
Segunda División B players
Tercera División players
CD Basconia footballers
Bilbao Athletic footballers
Elche CF players
Granada CF footballers
Barakaldo CF footballers
Athletic Bilbao footballers
Challenger Pro League players
Royale Union Saint-Gilloise players
Identical twins
Spanish expatriate sportspeople in Belgium
Expatriate footballers in Belgium
Sportspeople from Biscay